Christianity in New Zealand dates to the arrival of missionaries from the Church Missionary Society who were welcomed onto the beach at Rangihoua Bay in December 1814. It soon became the predominant belief amongst the indigenous people with an estimated 60% of Māori pledging allegiance to the Christian message within the first 35 years. It remains New Zealand's largest religious group, but no one denomination is dominant and there is no official state church. Today, slightly less than half the population identify as Christian. The largest Christian groups are Catholic, Anglican and Presbyterian. Christian organisations are the leading non-government providers of social services in New Zealand.

History

The first Christian services conducted in New Zealand were carried out by Father Paul-Antoine Léonard de Villefeix, the Dominican chaplain on the ship Saint Jean Baptiste commanded by the French navigator and explorer Jean-François-Marie de Surville. Villefeix was the first Christian minister to set foot in New Zealand, and he celebrated Mass near Whatuwhiwhi in Doubtless Bay on Christmas Day in 1769. He is reported to have also led prayers for the sick the previous day and to have conducted Christian burials.

The first Christian missionaries to establish permanent ministries arrived in New Zealand at the start of the 19th century. The Church Mission Society, an Anglican organisation, established a presence in New Zealand in 1814, with the permission and protection of Ngā Puhi chief Ruatara. This expedition was led by Samuel Marsden. It was this initiative which led to the rapid acceptance of Christian belief amongst Māori, reinforced by the learning of te Reo Māori by Protestant missionaries and the training and mobilisation of indigenous ministers.

The dedication of the missionaries directly led to their involvement in helping write the founding document of the nation - Te Tiriti o Waitangi  (or Treaty of Waitangi) on 6 February 1840.

Later missionaries brought other religious denominations – Jean Baptiste Pompallier played an important role in establishing the Catholic Church in New Zealand. Presbyterianism was brought to New Zealand largely by Scottish settlers. The Māori people also created their own forms of Christianity, with Ratana and Ringatu being the largest.

The Sisters of Mercy arrived in Auckland in 1850 and were the first order of religious sisters to come to New Zealand and began work in health care and education.
At the direction of Mary MacKillop (St Mary of the Cross), the Sisters of St Joseph of the Sacred Heart arrived in New Zealand and established schools. In 1892, Suzanne Aubert established the Sisters of Compassion – the first Catholic order established in New Zealand for women. The Anglican Church in New Zealand recognises her as a saintly person and in 1997 the New Zealand Catholic Bishops' Conference agreed to support the "Introduction of the Cause of Suzanne Aubert", to begin the process of consideration for her canonisation as a saint by the Catholic Church.

Although there was some hostility between Catholic and Protestants in the 19th and early 20th centuries, this declined after the 1920s. Sectarian groups such as the Orange Order continue to exist in New Zealand but are now virtually invisible.  New Zealand's first Catholic Prime Minister, Joseph Ward, took office in 1906. The founding of the National Council of Churches (NCC) in 1941 marked the positive relationships between New Zealand Christians. The NCC was an important voice of the churches in national affairs. The NCC was replaced in 1988 by a new ecumenical body which included Catholics—the Conference of Churches in Aotearoa New Zealand (CCANZ) which was ended in 2005. There is now very little sectarianism in New Zealand and various churches commonly co-operate on issues of common interest, and various ecumenical bodies exist promoting co-operation between Christians.

Demographics
The proportion of New Zealanders who identify as Christian is declining—accounting for around forty percent of responses to the 2018 census, whereas in the 1991 census it stood at around three-quarters. Christian groups are experiencing mixed trends. Anglicanism and Presbyterianism are both losing adherents at a rapid rate, while smaller Protestant groups and non-denominational churches are growing.

(Note: All figures are for the census usually resident population.
Percentages are based on number of responses rather than total population. These are nominal.
The 2011 census was cancelled due to the 2011 Christchurch earthquake
In all censuses, up to four responses were collected.)

Geographic distribution

The number of Christians in New Zealand varies slightly across different parts of the country – as of the 2006 census, the number of Christians in each territorial authority ranged from a low of 43.7% (in Kawerau) to a high of 63.4% (in Ashburton). In general, the tendency is for rural areas, particularly in the lower South Island, to have somewhat higher numbers of Christians, and urban areas to have lower numbers – of the sixteen designated Cities of New Zealand, fifteen have a smaller proportion of Christians than the country as a whole (the exception being Invercargill). The average proportion of Christians in the sixteen cities is 50.2%.

Denominations and organisations

Catholicism, associated mostly with New Zealanders of Irish, Polish, descent, is the most evenly distributed of the three main denominations, although it still has noticeable strengths in south and central Taranaki, on the West Coast, and in Kaikoura. It is also the largest denomination in Auckland and Wellington, although not by a great extent. The territorial authorities with the highest proportion of Catholics are Kaikoura (where they are 18.4% of the total population), Westland (18.3%), and Grey (17.8%). The territorial authorities with the lowest proportion of Catholics are Tasman (8.1%), Clutha (8.7%), and Western Bay of Plenty (8.7%).

Anglicanism, associated mostly with New Zealanders of English descent, is common in most parts of the country, but is strongest in Canterbury (the city of Christchurch having been founded as an Anglican settlement) and on the North Island's East Coast. It is the largest denomination in most parts of rural New Zealand, the main exception being the lower South Island. The territorial authorities with the highest proportion of Anglicans are Gisborne (where they are 27.4% of the total population), Wairoa (27.1%), and Hurunui (24.9%). The territorial authorities with the lowest proportion of Anglicans are Invercargill (7.7%), Manukau (8.3%), and Clutha (8.5%).

Presbyterianism, associated mostly with New Zealanders of Scottish descent, is strong in the lower South Island – the city of Dunedin was founded as a Presbyterian settlement, and many of the early settlers in the region were Scottish Presbyterians. Elsewhere, however, Presbyterians are usually outnumbered by both Anglicans and Catholics, making Presbyterianism the most geographically concentrated of the three main denominations. The territorial authorities with the highest proportion of Presbyterians are Gore (where they are 30.9% of the total population), Clutha (30.7%), and Southland (29.8%). The territorial authorities with the lowest proportion of Presbyterians are Far North (4.4%), Kaipara (6.2%), and Wellington (6.7%).

Pentecostalism and non denominational churches are amongst one of the highest denominations according to the 2018 census. Examples of these churches are Life Church in Auckland, Curate Church in Mount Maunganui, Arise in Wellington and Harmony Church in Christchurch.

Christian organisations in New Zealand are heavily involved in community activities including education; health services; chaplaincy to prisons, rest homes and hospitals; social justice and human rights advocacy. Approximately 11% of New Zealand students attend Catholic schools; the Anglican Church administers a number of schools; and schools administered by members of the New Zealand Association for Christian Schools educated 13,000 students in 2009.

Culture and the arts

Architecture 

 

The architectural landscape of New Zealand has been affected by Christianity and the prominence of churches in cities, towns and the countryside attests to its historical importance in New Zealand. Notable Cathedrals include the Anglican Holy Trinity Cathedral, Auckland, ChristChurch Cathedral, Christchurch and Saint Paul's Cathedral, Wellington and the Catholic St Patrick's Cathedral, Auckland, Sacred Heart Cathedral, Wellington, Cathedral of the Blessed Sacrament, Christchurch, St. Joseph's Cathedral, Dunedin. The iconic Futuna Chapel was built as a Wellington retreat center for the Catholic Marist order in 1961. The design by Māori architect John Scott, fuses Modernist and indigenous design principles.

Festivals 
The Christian festivals of Christmas and Easter are marked by public holidays in New Zealand. Christmas Day, 25 December, falls during the Southern Hemisphere Summer allowing open air carolling and barbecues in the sun. Nevertheless, various Northern hemisphere traditions have continued in New Zealand – including roast dinners and Christmas trees, with the pohutukawa regarded as New Zealand's iconic Christmas tree. New Zealand once hosted the largest Christian music festival in the Southern Hemisphere, Parachute Music Festival, however in 2014, the music festival was cancelled due to financial difficulties. Large Christian Easter events still occur like Eastercamp, a Christian youth event in South Island attended by 3500 youths from over 50 youth groups and churches.

Music 
Christian and Māori choral traditions have been blended in New Zealand to produce a distinct contribution to Christian music, including the popular hymns Whakaria Mai and Tama Ngakau Marie.

Media 
New Zealand has many media organisations and personalities. Frank Ritchie, is a New Zealand radio broadcaster, Media Chaplain, and ordained Christian Minister who is a Sunday evening radio host on Newstalk ZB.

Rhema Media is a Christian media organisation in New Zealand. It owns radio networks Rhema, Life FM and Star, and television station Shine TV.

2021 COVID-19 Church Responses 
In November 2021, the New Zealand government announced that New Zealand will head into a traffic light system. This meant that New Zealand churches had to choose between having a smaller congregation of both unvaccinated and vaccinated members attend or the alternative of an unlimited amount of attendees that provided a vaccination pass. Many churches like Auckland's Life Church, Wellington's Arise Church and Christchurch's Harmony Church opted to take their ministry online over the Christmas period.

Politics

Christianity has never had official status as a national religion in New Zealand, and a poll in 2007 found 58 percent of people were opposed to official status being granted. Despite this, each sitting day of the New Zealand Parliament opens with a Christian prayer. In contrast to England, where the Anglican Church is the officially established church, in New Zealand the Anglican Church has no special status, although it often officiates at civic events such as Anzac Day.

Most New Zealanders consider politicians' religious beliefs to be a private matter and although many New Zealand Prime Ministers have been professing Christians, the incumbent, Jacinda Ardern and two recent predecessors, John Key and Helen Clark are agnostic.

Christian political parties have never gained significant support and have often been characterised by controversy. Many of these are now defunct, such as the Christian Democrat Party, the Christian Heritage Party (which collapsed after leader Graham Capill was convicted as a child sex offender), Destiny New Zealand, The Family Party, and the New Zealand Pacific Party (whose leader Taito Phillip Field was convicted on bribery and corruption charges). The Exclusive Brethren gained public notoriety during the 2005 election for distributing anti-Labour pamphlets, which former National Party leader Don Brash later admitted to knowledge of.

The two main political parties, Labour and National, are not religious, although religious groups have at times played a significant role (e.g. the Rātana movement). Politicians are often involved in public dialogue with religious groups.

Controversy
In 1967, Presbyterian minister and theologian Lloyd Geering was the subject of one of the few heresy trials of the 20th century, with a judgement that no doctrinal error had been proved. The Catholic Church in New Zealand had a number of its priests convicted of child sexual abuse, notably at Marylands School. Newspapers have also reported child sex abuse cases within the Exclusive Brethren.

According to a 2019 survey, nearly four in ten New Zealanders lacked trust in Evangelical churches.

See also

National Statement on Religious Diversity
Religion in New Zealand
Christmas in New Zealand

References

Further reading

 Harper, Tobia, "'Amen, Amen!'" New Zealand Journal of History (2008) 42#2 pp 133–153. Studies the impact of Christianity on New Zealand society in the 1920s

External links

Interdenominational Christianity – Te Ara: The Encyclopedia of New Zealand
New Zealand topics – Christianity Today